"Maxwell's Silver Hammer" is a song by the English rock band the Beatles from their 1969 album Abbey Road. It was written by Paul McCartney and credited to the Lennon–McCartney partnership. The song is about a student named Maxwell Edison who commits murders with a hammer, with the dark lyrics disguised by an upbeat sound. McCartney described the song as symbolic of the downfalls of life, being "my analogy for when something goes wrong out of the blue, as it so often does".

The song was initially rehearsed during the Get Back sessions in January 1969. During the recording of Abbey Road in July and August, the band devoted four recording sessions to completing the track. These sessions were an acrimonious time for the Beatles, as McCartney pressured the group to work at length on the song. All three of his bandmates were vocal in their dislike of "Maxwell's Silver Hammer". In a 2008 interview, Ringo Starr remembered it as "the worst session ever" and "the worst track we ever had to record".

Background
While in Rishikesh, India, in early 1968, McCartney began to write the first verse of the song. Having completed most of it by October that year, he intended for its inclusion on the album The Beatles, but it was never properly recorded during those sessions due to time constraints. It was rehearsed again three months later, in January 1969, at Twickenham film studios during the Get Back sessions but would not be recorded for another six months.

McCartney's wife Linda said that he had become interested in avant-garde theatre and had immersed himself in the writings of the experimental French author Alfred Jarry.  This influence is reflected in the story and tone of "Maxwell's Silver Hammer", and also explains how McCartney came across Jarry's word "pataphysical", which occurs in the lyrics. In 1994, McCartney said that the song epitomises the downfalls of life, being "my analogy for when something goes wrong out of the blue, as it so often does, as I was beginning to find out at that time in my life. I wanted something symbolic of that, so to me it was some fictitious character called Maxwell with a silver hammer. I don't know why it was silver, it just sounded better than Maxwell's hammer."

Recording
The Beatles began recording the song at EMI Studios (later Abbey Road Studios) in London on 9 July 1969. John Lennon, who had been absent from recording sessions for the previous eight days after being injured in a car crash in Scotland, arrived to work on the song, accompanied by his wife, Yoko Ono, who, more badly hurt in the accident than Lennon, lay on a large double-bed in the studio. Sixteen takes of the rhythm track were made, followed by a series of guitar overdubs. The unused fifth take can be heard on Anthology 3. Over the following two days the group overdubbed vocals, piano, Hammond organ, anvil, and guitar. The song was completed on 6 August, when McCartney recorded a solo on a Moog synthesizer.

The recording process subsequently drew unfavourable comments from Lennon, George Harrison and Ringo Starr. Lennon said, "I was ill after the accident when they did most of that track, and it really ground George and Ringo into the ground recording it", adding later: "I hate it, 'cos all I remember is the track ... [Paul] did everything to make it into a single, and it never was and it never could have been." In the recollection of engineer Geoff Emerick, Lennon dismissed it as "more of Paul's granny music". Harrison recalled: "Sometimes Paul would make us do these really fruity songs. I mean, my God, 'Maxwell's Silver Hammer' was so fruity. After a while we did a good job on it, but when Paul got an idea or an arrangement in his head …" Starr told Rolling Stone in 2008: "The worst session ever was 'Maxwell's Silver Hammer.' It was the worst track we ever had to record. It went on for fucking weeks. I thought it was mad." McCartney recalled: "The only arguments were about things like me spending three days on 'Maxwell's Silver Hammer.' I remember George saying, 'You've taken three days, it's only a song.' – 'Yeah, but I want to get it right. I've got some thoughts on this one.'"

Aftermath
In a taped recording of a band meeting conducted in September 1969, Lennon raised the possibility of individual songwriting responsibilities being split equally between the three of them in future. In this arrangement, each of the writers would contribute four songs to an album, and Starr would have the opportunity to contribute two. Beatles historian Mark Lewisohn comments on the exchange that proceeded between the three bandmates (Starr was not present):
Paul... responds to the news that George now has equal standing as a composer with John and himself by muttering something mildly provocative. "I thought until this album that George's songs weren't that good," he says, which is a pretty double-edged compliment since the earlier compositions he's implicitly disparaging include Taxman and While My Guitar Gently Weeps. There's a nettled rejoinder from George: "That's a matter of taste. All down the line, people have liked my songs." John reacts by telling Paul that nobody else in the group "dug" his Maxwell's Silver Hammer... and that it might be a good idea if he gave songs of that kind – which, John suggests, he probably didn't even dig himself – to outside artists in whom he had an interest... "I recorded it," a drowsy Paul says, "because I liked it."

Contemporary reviews
In his 1969 review of Abbey Road, for Rolling Stone, John Mendelsohn wrote: "Paul McCartney and Ray Davies are the only two writers in rock and roll who could have written 'Maxwell's Silver Hammer', a jaunty vaudevillian/music-hallish celebration wherein Paul, in a rare naughty mood, celebrates the joys of being able to bash in the heads of anyone threatening to bring you down. Paul puts it across perfectly with the coyest imaginable choir-boy innocence." Writing in Oz magazine, Barry Miles described the song as "a complex little piece" and said that, aside from McCartney's casual interest in Jarry's work, "The only British pop group holding any pataphysical honours are The Soft Machine". Miles also said it was "a perfect example of Paul's combination of American Rock with British brass band music".

Derek Jewell of The Sunday Times found the album "refreshingly terse and unpretentious", but lamented the inclusion of "cod-1920s jokes (Maxwell's Silver Hammer)" and "Ringo's obligatory nursery arias (Octopus's Garden)". In 1974, Robert Christgau referred to "Maxwell's Silver Hammer" as "a McCartney crotchet".

Retrospective assessments and legacy
Among Beatles biographers, Ian MacDonald said that "If any single recording shows why The Beatles broke up, it's 'Maxwell's Silver Hammer'." He continued:  Author Jonathan Gould cites "Maxwell's Silver Hammer" as an example of the selfishness inherent in the Beatles' creative partnership, whereby a composition by McCartney or Lennon would be given preference over a more substantial song by Harrison. He also rues McCartney's penchant for a light entertainment style that the Beatles had sought to render obsolete, and concludes: 

In 2009, PopMatters editor John Bergstrom concluded his list "the worst of the Beatles" with the song. He said that while McCartney had previously created "some borderline-schmaltzy, music hall-inspired songs", "Maxwell's Silver Hammer" was "where even the secret admirer of 'Rocky Raccoon' must draw the line". Bergstrom described it as "Unnervingly 'cute', unrelentingly obnoxious, too literal-minded by half" and "the single Beatles song out of nearly 200 that is basically unlistenable".

In 2020, author John Tait paired the song with "Mack the Knife" as noteworthy contemporary murder ballads about serial killers.

Cover versions
 In 1972, the Canadian band the Bells covered "Maxwell's Silver Hammer". Their version became a hit in Canada.  It reached number 83 on the Pop chart and number two on the Canadian Adult Contemporary chart.
 In the 1978 film Sgt. Pepper's Lonely Hearts Club Band, the song is performed by comedian Steve Martin, who portrays the character Maxwell Edison. Frankie Laine also covered the song as part of the musical documentary All This and World War II, which featured stock and newsreel footage of the Second World War set to performances of music by the Beatles.
The MonaLisa Twins covered "Maxwell's Silver Hammer" with a 2015 video published on YouTube Music in 2015.

Personnel

According to Kevin Howlett, except where noted:

The Beatles
 Paul McCartney lead and harmony vocals, piano, acoustic guitar, Moog synthesizer
 George Harrison harmony vocal, bass, electric guitars
 Ringo Starr harmony vocal, drums, anvil

Additional musician
 George Martin Hammond organ

Notes

References

Sources

External links

 

1969 songs
Song recordings produced by George Martin
Songs written by Lennon–McCartney
The Beatles songs
Black comedy music
Murder ballads
Songs published by Northern Songs
Music hall songs